Florian Koch (born 26 March 1992) is a German professional basketball player who last played for Gießen 46ers of the Basketball Bundesliga. For the most part of his career, he played for the Baskets Bonn. On 10 June 2017 Koch left the team.

On 19 June 2017 Koch signed with MHP Riesen Ludwigsburg for the 2017–18 season. On 30 May 2018, he signed a two-year deal with s.Oliver Würzburg. On 28 July 2020, Koch re-signed with the team.

On June 2, 2021, he has signed with Gießen 46ers of the Basketball Bundesliga.

References

External links
 Eurocup Profile
 German BBL Profile
 Eurobasket.com Profile

1992 births
Living people
German men's basketball players
Giessen 46ers players
Riesen Ludwigsburg players
Small forwards
s.Oliver Würzburg players
Sportspeople from Bonn
Telekom Baskets Bonn players